The 1954 Masters Tournament was the 18th Masters Tournament, held April 8–12 at Augusta National Golf Club in Augusta, Georgia. Sam Snead defeated defending champion Ben Hogan by one stroke in an 18-hole Monday playoff to win his third Masters tournament. It was Snead's seventh and final major victory.

Both Snead and Hogan were age 41, and they had won the previous three Masters; Snead in 1952 and Hogan in 1951 and 1953. Hogan was also the reigning champion of the U.S. Open and British Open; he did not win another major, but often contended until his final appearances in 1967 at the Masters and U.S. Open.

Snead's 289 (+1), along with Jack Burke Jr. in 1956 and Zach Johnson in 2007, remains the highest winning total in Masters history. Amateur Billy Joe Patton, 31, led after the first and second rounds and during the fourth, but a seven at the 13th hole and a six at the 15th ended his title hopes, and he finished one stroke back.

Snead remained the oldest winner of the Masters for nearly a quarter century, until Gary Player won his third green jacket at age 42 in 1978.

Field
1. Masters champions
Jimmy Demaret (10), Claude Harmon (12), Ben Hogan (2,4,6,9,10), Byron Nelson (2,6), Gene Sarazen (2,4,6), Horton Smith, Sam Snead (4,6,7,9,10), Craig Wood (2)
Ralph Guldahl (2), Herman Keiser and Henry Picard (6) did not play.

2. U.S. Open champions
Julius Boros (9,10), Lawson Little (3,5), Lloyd Mangrum (7,9,10), Fred McLeod, Cary Middlecoff (7), Sam Parks Jr., Lew Worsham

3. U.S. Amateur champions
Dick Chapman (5,8,a), Charles Coe (8,9,a), Gene Littler (8,11), Billy Maxwell, Skee Riegel, Jess Sweetser (5,a)

4. British Open champions
Jock Hutchison (6), Denny Shute (6)

5. British Amateur champions
Frank Stranahan (9,10,a), Robert Sweeny Jr. (a), Harvie Ward (8,9,a)

6. PGA champions
Walter Burkemo (7,12), Jim Ferrier (9), Vic Ghezzi, Chandler Harper (9), Johnny Revolta, Jim Turnesa (7,10)

7. Members of the U.S. 1953 Ryder Cup team
Jack Burke Jr. (9,10), Dave Douglas (12), Fred Haas (10), Ted Kroll (9,10), Ed Oliver (9)

8. Members of the U.S. 1953 Walker Cup team
Arnold Blum (a), William C. Campbell (a), Don Cherry (a), Jimmy Jackson (a), Jim McHale Jr. (a), Billy Joe Patton (a), Ken Venturi (a)

Sam Urzetta (3,a) and Jack Westland (3,a) did not play. Blum, McHale and Patton were reserves for the team.

9. Top 24 players and ties from the 1953 Masters Tournament
Jerry Barber, Al Besselink, Tommy Bolt, Doug Ford (10), Leland Gibson, Chick Harbert, Fred Hawkins, Dick Mayer, Al Mengert (10), Dick Metz (10), Johnny Palmer, Earl Stewart

Bob Hamilton (6) did not play.

10. Top 24 players and ties from the 1953 U.S. Open
Pete Cooper, Gardner Dickinson,  Clarence Doser, George Fazio, Marty Furgol, Dutch Harrison, Jay Hebert, Bill Nary (12), Bill Ogden, Bob Rosburg, Frank Souchak (a)

11. 1953 U.S. Amateur quarter-finalists
Don Albert (a), Bruce Cudd (a), Bobby Kuntz (a), Dale Morey (a), Ray Palmer (a), Angelo Santilli (a)

Ted Richards Jr. did not play.

12. 1953 PGA Championship quarter-finalists
Jimmy Clark, Jack Isaacs, Felice Torza

Henry Ransom did not play.

13. One amateur, not already qualified, selected by a ballot of ex-U.S. Amateur champions
Johnny Dawson (a) was selected but did not play.

14. One professional, not already qualified, selected by a ballot of ex-U.S. Open champions
Skip Alexander

15. Two players, not already qualified, with the best scoring average in the winter part of the 1954 PGA Tour
Bud Holscher, Bob Toski

16. Foreign invitations
Peter Thomson

Round summaries

First round
Thursday, April 8, 1954

Second round
Friday, April 9, 1954

Third round
Saturday, April 10, 1954

Final round
Sunday, April 11, 1954

Final leaderboard

Sources:

Scorecard

Cumulative tournament scores, relative to par
{|class="wikitable" span = 50 style="font-size:85%;
|-
|style="background: Red;" width=10|
|Eagle
|style="background: Pink;" width=10|
|Birdie
|style="background: PaleGreen;" width=10|
|Bogey
|style="background: Green;" width=10|
|Double bogey
|}

Playoff 
Monday, April 12, 1954

Scorecard

Source:

References

External links
Masters.com – past winners and results
GolfCompendium.com: 1954 Masters
Augusta.com – 1954 Masters leaderboard and scorecards

1954
1954 in golf
1954 in American sports
1954 in sports in Georgia (U.S. state)
April 1954 sports events in the United States